João Manuel da Silva Moreira (born 30 June 1970) is a Portuguese former professional footballer, who played as a defender for Swansea City in the Football League.

Club career
In summer 1996 Swansea City manager Jan Mølby spent £50,000 to bring Moreira to the Welsh club, then languishing in the Third Division. It was reported that Moreira was a former Benfica player who had recently had a trial with Birmingham City. At Swansea Moreira lived with teammate Jason Price, near a group of students who had a Jacuzzi. The duo's off-field antics and excessive partying resulted in a rebuke from coach Alan Curtis. Quickly nicknamed "Joe" Moreira, a knee injury sustained in pre-season kept him out of the Swansea team until November 1996, when he played in a 1–0 win over Brighton. Huw Richards wrote in When Saturday Comes that "elegant but over-left-footed" Moreira became rated highly by supporters at the Vetch Field. Moreira played in the 1997 Football League Third Division play-off Final, which Swansea lost 1–0 to an injury time goal from Northampton Town's John Frain. When Mølby was sacked as manager, Moreira fell out of favour. He was made available for transfer in November 1997 and released in summer 1998.

Honours
Swansea City
Football League Third Division play-offs runner-up: 1997

Notes

References

External links
 (Soccerbase incorrectly attributes Daniel Moreira's four European appearances for RC Lens against Arsenal to João Moreira.)

Portuguese footballers
1970 births
Living people
Footballers from Porto
Association football defenders
Swansea City A.F.C. players
English Football League players
Portuguese expatriate footballers
Portuguese expatriate sportspeople in Wales
Expatriate footballers in Wales
C.D. Nacional players
AD Fafe players
Anadia F.C. players
SC São João de Ver players